Kai Kazmirek (born 28 January 1991) is a German track and field athlete who competes in the decathlon. He holds a personal best of 8580 points for the event achieved in Rio 2016, as well as an indoor heptathlon best of 6173 points. He is a member of LG Rhein-Wied athletics club.

He represented Germany at the 2014 IAAF World Indoor Championships, placing sixth. A two-time German champion (decathlon in 2012, heptathlon in 2014), he was also the winner at the 2013 European Athletics U23 Championships.

Career
Born in Torgau, he initially specialised in the high jump and was the 2008 German youth champion in the event. He also competed in the combined events youth championships, coming seventh outdoors and fourth indoors. In 2009 he was indoor heptathlon runner-up at the national junior championships and also came third in the high jump. Outdoors, he placed third in the junior long jump, won in the junior decathlon section of the Mehrkampf-Meeting Ratingen, then claimed a bronze medal at the 2009 European Athletics Junior Championships in a personal best of 7639 points. The year after he won the German junior heptathlon title and improved his decathlon score to 7829 points. He placed sixth at both the 2010 World Junior Championships in Athletics and the 2011 European Athletics U23 Championships.

The 2012 Thorpe Cup saw him reach new heights in the senior division. He scored over eight thousand points for the first time and won the competition with a total of 8130 points. He won his first national title in the event but did not gain selection for the 2012 London Olympics as national rivals Rico Freimuth, Pascal Behrenbruch, and Jan Felix Knobel had all performed better on the decathlon circuit that year.

Kazmirek improved to 8350 points at the Ratingen meeting in 2013 and followed this up with an 8366-point best to win the gold medal at the 2013 European Athletics U23 Championships. However, again he was ranked outside of the top three nationally and was not selected for the 2013 World Championships in Athletics. He regarded this as a good thing, saying: "We have got a really strong Decathlon squad in Germany and I am really happy about that. We can learn so much from each other...I get an enormous amount from it". Kazmirek ranked ninth in Europe that year.

He opened the 2014 indoor season with a heptathlon best of 6083 points to win the German indoor title. This earned him his first senior international selection and he improved further at the 2014 IAAF World Indoor Championships, taking sixth overall with a total score of 6173.

Personal bests
Decathlon – 8580 points (2016)
100 metres – 10.62 sec (2016)
400 metres – 46.75 sec (2011)
1500 metres – 4:31.25 min (2016)
110 m hurdles – 14.05 sec (2014)
High jump – 2.15 m (2014)
Pole vault – 5.20 m (2013)
Long jump – 7.69 m (2016)
Shot put – 14.82 m (2017)
Discus throw – 45.83 m (2015)
Javelin throw – 64.60 m (2016)
Heptathlon – 6238 points (2018)
60 metres – 7.01 sec (2015)
1000 metres – 2:39.51 min (2014)
60 m hurdles – 7.95 sec (2018)
High jump – 2.09 m (2016)
Pole vault – 5.20 m (2014)
Long jump –7.68 m (2018)
Shot put – 14.55 m (2018)

References

External links

1991 births
Living people
People from Torgau
German decathletes
Sportspeople from Saxony
World Athletics Championships athletes for Germany
Olympic athletes of Germany
Athletes (track and field) at the 2016 Summer Olympics
World Athletics Championships medalists
Athletes (track and field) at the 2020 Summer Olympics